The 2018 Georgia State Panthers football team represented Georgia State University (GSU) in the 2018 NCAA Division I FBS football season. The Panthers were led by second-year head coach Shawn Elliott. The season was the Panthers' sixth in the Sun Belt Conference, first within the East Division, and ninth since starting football. They played their home games at Georgia State Stadium. They finished the season 2–10, 1–7 in Sun Belt play to finish in last place in the East Division.

Previous season
In 2017, the Panthers played their first season under new head coach (and accompanying staff) Shawn Elliott. After a short recruiting year (due to turnover of staff), Elliott managed to put together one of Georgia State's highest rated recruiting classes. After losing the opening game at the Panther's new stadium Georgia State Stadium, a conversion of the former Turner Field, the Panthers would go on to become bowl eligible for the second time in the programs seven-year history, defeating the Western Kentucky Hilltoppers at the Cure Bowl.

Recruiting

Recruits
As of December 21, 2016, the Panthers have a total of 20 recruits committed. Eight are three-star recruits.

Preseason

Award watch lists
Listed in the order that they were released

Sun Belt coaches poll
On July 19, 2018, the Sun Belt released their preseason coaches poll with the Panthers predicted to finish in third place in the East Division.

Preseason All-Sun Belt Teams
The Panthers had five players selected to the preseason all-Sun Belt teams.

Offense

1st team

Penny Hart – WR

2nd team

Hunter Atkinson – TE

Shamarious Gilmore – OL

Defense

1st team

Michael Shaw – LB

2nd team

Marterious Allen – DL

Coaching and support staff

Schedule
Georgia State announced its 2018 football schedule on February 27, 2018. The 2018 schedule consists of 6 home and away games in the regular season. The Panthers host Sun Belt foes ULM, Coastal Carolina, Texas State, and in-state rivals Georgia Southern, and traveled to Troy, Arkansas State, Louisiana, and Appalachian State. Georgia State will not play Sun Belt foe South Alabama this year. The team will play four non-conference games, two home game against Kennesaw State, an FCS team from the Big South Conference, Western Michigan from the Mid-American Conference (MAC), and two road games against NC State from the Atlantic Coast Conference (ACC) and Memphis from the American Athletic Conference (AAC).

Schedule source:

Game summaries

Kennesaw State

at NC State

at Memphis

Western Michigan

Louisiana–Monroe

at Troy

at Arkansas State

Coastal Carolina

Texas State

at Louisiana

at Appalachian State

Georgia Southern

References

Georgia State
Georgia State Panthers football seasons
Georgia State Panthers football